Alan Jenkinson (born 11 February 1952) is an Australian boxer. He competed in the men's light middleweight event at the 1972 Summer Olympics.

References

1952 births
Living people
Australian male boxers
Olympic boxers of Australia
Boxers at the 1972 Summer Olympics
Place of birth missing (living people)
Light-middleweight boxers